Elwin Hendrijanto (born 3 of February 1986) is an Indonesian composer, pianist, music producer, and music director.

Education 
In 2008, Elwin graduated cum laude on a scholarship for Bachelors of Music in Performance Classical Piano from Utrechts Conservatorium. He then continued his studies at the Royal College of Music in London where he studied both Integrated Masters Programme in Composition for Screen and Integrated Masters PGdip in Performance Classical Piano on a scholarship which was supported by the Prince Bernhard Cultural Funds.

Career

The Piano Brothers 
During his studies at the Royal College of Music, Elwin teamed up with Dominic Ferris and created The Piano Brothers. Their international concert tours consists of live performances in which the duo plays their own arrangements. They have had collaborations with the London Symphony Orchestra and has made a performance on the Friday Night Is Music Night for BBC Radio 2 together with the BBC Concert Orchestra.

Composition 
Known for his works in crossover and orchestral music, Elwin has made music for internationally known artists such as The Beach Boys, Roy Orbison and the Royal Philharmonic Orchestra. He also made the music for the first southeast Asian MOBA game called Lokapala (Game). Elwin Hendrijanto is the founder of Elwin Music, a music production and audio post production company, which has made works for internationally known companies.

In 2018, Elwin was commissioned to make the music for the 2018 Asian Games ad campaign which was held in Indonesia that year. In 2020, Elwin was chosen to be a Panel Jury for the Citra Pariwara awards for the Radio and Film Craft Category in which he had won a medal the year before for Best Use of Sound. Elwin also won the Regional Award for the Best Theme Song or Title Theme at the 2019 Asian Academy Creative Awards.

Filmography

Feature films

  directed by Pritagita Arianegara (2021)
 The Flame (Bara) directed by Arfan Sabran (2021)
 Preman (film) directed by Randolf Zaini (2020)
  directed by Erwin Budiono (2020)
 #MoveonAja directed by Hestu Saputra (2019)

Short films

 Cipak Cipuk by Andra Fembriarto (2021)
 Rain by Simran Sidhu (2017)
 Edit / Undo by Tom Brooks and Tom Shennan (2015)
 Hard to Lose by Manfredi Mancuso (2015)
 Termination by Simran Sidhu (2013)
 The Making of a Steinway Model B Grand Piano by Glen Milner 
 Untouchable by Simran Sidhu (2010)

TV and Web Series

 by Randolph Zaini
  
  season 1 and season 2
 Goresan Jejak 1 by Jurnal Indonesia Karya
 Goresan Jejak 2 by Jurnal Indonesia Karya

Discography

Albums and Singles

 Unchained Melodies with Roy Orbison and the Royal Philharmonic Orchestra as the orchestral arranger (2018)
 The Beach Boys with the Royal Philharmonic Orchestra album as the orchestral arranger (2018)
 Nusantara with The Resonanz Children's Choir as the original composer (2018)
  Main Title (Original Series Soundtrack) as the original composer (2018)
 Lokapala Main Theme (Original Game Soundtrack) as the original composer (2020)
 Nusantara with English title "Sing for our World" with Libera Choir as the original composer (2021)

Compositions

 Apresiasi Bangsa TVC Campaign by Gudang Garam (2020)
 Sound of Indonesia TVC Campaign by Gudang Garam (2019)
 Musical drama Suara Hati as the original song composer (2017)
 Ballade for Steinway, an original composition as The Piano Brothers for Steinway and Sons (2015)

References

Elwin Hendrijanto 

Indonesian musicians
Indonesian composers
Indonesian people of Chinese descent
Indonesian pianists
Living people
1986 births
21st-century pianists